Pteracantha agrestis is a species of beetle in the family Cerambycidae. It was described by Monné & Monné in 2002.

References

Trachyderini
Beetles described in 2002